All American Nightmare is the third studio album by American rock band Hinder. Released on December 7, 2010 by Universal Republic Records, it is the band's successor to Take It to the Limit, which was released in 2008. All American Nightmare is significantly heavier in sound than either of the band's previous two records.

Production
Hinder began recording the album in early 2010 with producer Kevin Churko. The band had originally selected Howard Benson to produce the album, but Churko was later hired for the role. According to singer Austin Winkler, he and drummer Cody Hanson wrote around 60 songs for the album, of which 10 were recorded for the standard release, and an additional two which are on the deluxe version of the album. The writing process was different from what the band had done in the past; Winkler said that "We normally do whatever the label wants. But for this record, we had to do something different. We had to mix it up a little bit."

The album was recorded in two parts; all music was recorded at Hanson's personal studio, while vocals, performed by Winkler, were recorded at his studio in Las Vegas.

Winkler said that he was pleased with the album, saying that "I'm ecstatic about the album...I've never been more proud of a record than I have with this one."

"I kinda went at it with the approach that I am a little hungrier, and took a more personal approach," Winkler told Alternative Addiction in a 2010 interview.  "We went a little darker and a little heavier with this record, it's a little more real.".

Songs
Winkler said that the band had intentionally modified the sound of the music on the album, intending for it to sound like "Southern rock with a twist, but still heavy." He said further that many of the songs on the album are dissimilar to one another, with "some unique songs on there."  According to a writer from Youngstown, Ohio's The Vindicator, the songs ranged from "the rocking title track, the album's lead single, as well as the popish 'Hey Ho' and the ballad 'What Ya Gonna Do.'"

In addition to Winkler and Hanson, the band asked other musicians to be involved with the writing of several songs.  Winkler said that "We went around and wrote with anybody we could think of, just to see what would happen and to get a different vibe. We knew we needed a different flavor and some different influences in there."

The song "Waking Up the Devil" was released on the Saw 3D soundtrack in October 2010.

Release
While early reports said only that the album was to come out in the second half of 2010, and it was subsequently scheduled to be released on December 14, the album was then released on December 7.

The first single, the title track of the album, was released on September 14, 2010 and made available for digital download on October 5.

The band released music videos for two songs, "All American Nightmare" and "What Ya Gonna Do."

The album's cover art was released on November 3, 2010, featuring model Jesse Lee Denning on the cover, who also performed in the music video for "All American Nightmare." Jesse Lee Denning is a tattoo/fashion model and is dating Brian Deneeve (songwriter and former guitarist for "From Autumn to Ashes"). The band has been quoted as jokingly saying that all anyone talks about is Jesse Lee as opposed to their songs.

It was announced on October 10, 2011 that "The Life" would be released as the album's third single.

Reception

Initial reactions to the album were mixed; a reviewer for AllMusic called the album "resolutely a re-creation of rock & roll past," and gave it a rating of one and a half stars out of five. In a favorable review, Hard Rock Haven said the album "stands out" among other modern rock albums, and gave it an eight out of ten rating.

Track listing
All songs written by Austin Winkler, Cody Hanson and The Warren Brothers, except where noted.

The following is the track listing for All American Nightmare:

Deluxe Edition

Personnel
Austin Winkler - lead vocals
Joe Garvey - lead guitar, backing vocals
Mark King - rhythm guitar, backing vocals
Mike Rodden - bass
Cody Hanson - drums

Sales
The album sold 35,000 copies during its first week on sale in the United States, and debuted on the Billboard 200 chart at number 37.

Charts

Weekly charts

Year-end charts

References

Hinder albums
2010 albums
Universal Records albums
Albums produced by Kevin Churko